Sabirou Bassa-Djeri (born 17 June 1987) is a Togolese international footballer who plays for Nigerian club Enyimba, as a goalkeeper.

Career
Born in Sokodé, he has played club football for Tchaoudjo AC, AC Semassi, Gbikinti, Béké and Coton Sport. In November 2020 he signed for Nigerian club Enyimba.

He made his international debut for Togo in 2017.

References

1987 births
Living people
Togolese footballers
Togo international footballers
Tchaoudjo AC players
AC Semassi FC players
Gbikinti FC de Bassar players
Béké Bembèrèkè players
Coton Sport FC de Garoua players
Enyimba F.C. players
Association football goalkeepers
Togolese expatriate footballers
Togolese expatriate sportspeople in Benin
Expatriate footballers in Benin
Togolese expatriate sportspeople in Cameroon
Expatriate footballers in Cameroon
Togolese expatriate sportspeople in Nigeria
Expatriate footballers in Nigeria
21st-century Togolese people